Postcards from the Zoo is a 2012 Indonesian drama film written and directed by Edwin. The film was screened in competition at the 62nd Berlin International Film Festival in February 2012, making Edwin the first Indonesian filmmaker to do so in 49 years.

Synopsis 
Lana is a child who is abandoned by her father and left in the care of a giraffe trainer in a zoo. Lana grows up among animals, visiting and feeding them in their enclosures. For Lana, physical touch is the one experience she shares with her father and unconsciously, she always longs to be touched, which is why Lana falls in love with a magician who comes into the zoo.

Cast
 Ladya Cheryl as Lana
Klarysa Aurelia as young Lana
Nicholas Saputra as Magician/Cowboy

Release
The film never received a wide theatrical release in Indonesia. It premiered at the 62nd Berlin International Film Festival on 15 February 2012, where it was the first Indonesian film in 49 years to compete in the main section for the Golden Bear, which eventually went to Caesar Must Die. A dubbed version received a limited release on 33 screens in Germany in January 2013 with the title of Die Nacht der Giraffe.

Reception
Postcards from the Zoo received positive reviews from critics, with David Jenkins of Little White Lies giving it a 4 out of 5 stars and claiming that the film will make audience "never look at a zoo in the same way again." In a more mixed review, Adrian Pasaribu of Cinema Poetica compared the film's unusual setting to Wong Kar-wai's My Blueberry Nights (2007) but praised its cinematography and Dave Lumenta's score.

Awards and nominations

References

External links
 
 

2012 films
2010s Indonesian-language films
2012 drama films
Indonesian drama films